Carrie L. Partch (born 30 November 1973) is an American protein biochemist and circadian biologist. Partch is currently a Professor in the Department of Chemistry and Biochemistry at the University of California, Santa Cruz. She is noted for her work using biochemical and biophysical techniques to study the mechanisms of circadian rhythmicity across multiple organisms.

Academic career 
Partch studied undergraduate Biochemistry with a minor in Italian at the University of Washington. After three years as a research technician at Oregon Health Sciences University, she went on to join the lab of Nobel Laureate Aziz Sancar at the University of North Carolina at Chapel Hill where she undertook her PhD research on the subject of signal transduction mechanisms by cryptochrome proteins.

For her post-doctoral research, Partch focussed on the interaction of the aryl hydrocarbon receptor nuclear translocator with its heterodimeric binding partner, the transcription factor HIF-2α, under Kevin Gardner at University of Texas Southwestern Medical Center. She subsequently moved this expertise into the circadian field to work with Joseph Takahashi, also at University of Texas Southwestern Medical Center, where she studied the related Basic Helix-Loop-Helix-PAS transcription factor that drives circadian rhythmicity, CLOCK:BMAL1.

Current research 
The Partch lab’s research focusses on the proteins known to circadian timekeeping, and utilizes a range of structural and biophysical techniques in order to characterize the biological role of these proteins including NMR spectroscopy and X-ray crystallography. Current projects include both mammalian and cyanobacterial timekeeping mechanisms. Notably, the lab recently published work in the journal Science, elucidating the role of the protein SasA in the cooperative binding of KaiB to the KaiC hexamer in the cyanobacterial circadian clock. In 2020, the lab published a paper describing how the mammalian circadian protein PERIOD and its cognate kinase Casein Kinase 1 form a molecular switch to regulate PERIOD protein stability, and so circadian periodicity

Awards 
2018 - “Aschoff’s Rule”, Gordon Conference on Chronobiology
2018 - Margaret Oakley Dayhoff Award, Biophysical Society
 2022 - NAS Award in Molecular Biology

References 

Biochemists
University of Washington alumni
University of North Carolina at Chapel Hill alumni
1973 births
Living people
University of California, Santa Cruz faculty
American women scientists